Lamb chop or Lambchop may refer to:

 Meat chop of lamb
Lamb meat
 Lamb Chop (puppet), a sock puppet sheep created by Shari Lewis and now played by her daughter Mallory
 Lambchop (band), an American alternative-country group
 Lamb Chop (horse), an American Thoroughbred racehorse
 Lambchops (film), a 1929 Burns and Allen comedy short film
 Lamb Chopz, an EP by Esham